Los Mier are a Mexican Grupera band.

References

Cumbia
Mexican musical groups